Ang Chen Xiang is an athlete from Singapore specialising in the 110m hurdles. He has held and rewritten the national record for the event several times.

Education and personal life

Ang was educated at Raffles Institution. At the A Division National Championships, he won back-to-back titles in the 110m hurdles. He attended National University of Singapore to earn his medical degree. 

Ang's brother, Ang Ding Hui, also competed in the 110m hurdles and also coached Ang.

Ang is a Christian.

Athletic career

In 2015, Ang ran 14.44s to set the national record for the 110m hurdles, which he bettered the same year during the 2015 SEA Games (14.38s). In 2017, he clocked 14.19s at the Thailand Open—after putting his medical studies at NUS on hold—but the record was not ratified. In 2019, he broke the national mark thrice: twice during the Singapore Open (14.27s and 14.26s) and once during the Asian Athletics Championships in Doha (14.25s). 

On 15 January 2022, Ang again rewrote the record for the 110m hurdles with a time of 14.16s. Eight days later, he became the first ever Singaporean to clock a sub-14 in the event, setting a new national mark of 13.97s at the Singapore National Championships and qualifying for the 2021 SEA Games in the process. There, he ran 13.94s to win a silver, Singapore's first medal at the event since 1989.

Ang also holds the national record for indoor 60m hurdles (8.16s); his personal best for the same event outdoors is 7.22s.

References

Singaporean male hurdlers
1994 births
Living people
Competitors at the 2021 Southeast Asian Games
Southeast Asian Games medalists in athletics
Southeast Asian Games silver medalists for Singapore
21st-century Singaporean people